The Mayor of Kapiti Coast officiates over the Kapiti Coast District of New Zealand's North Island.

Janet Holborow is the current mayor of Kapiti Coast. She was elected to the position in 2022.

List of mayors
Since its inception in 1989, Kapiti Coast District has had eight mayors:

List of deputy mayors

References

Kapiti Coast
Kapiti Coast
Kapiti Coast District
Kapiti